Charlotte's Necklace is a 1984 Soviet detective film directed by Yevgeny Tatarsky.  Screen version of the novel by Anatoly Romov Customs Inspection.

Plot
Officers of  KGB, experienced Colonel Seryogin and a young agent Pavlov, are investigating the murder of a fartsovshchik Viktor Korablyov. The investigation brings them to the trail of a criminal group that transports valuable works of jewelry abroad.

A duel with experienced and cunning criminals turns out to be a serious test for security officers. It turns out that the murder of Korablev is associated with an attempt to secretly export the famous antique piece known as the  Charlotte Necklace  abroad.

Cast
 Kirill Lavrov as KGB Colonel Vladimir Seryogin
 Vadim Ledogorov as Anton Pavlov
 Yury Kuznetsov as Korchyonov, repeat offender
 Igor Yankovsky as Viktor Korablyov 
 Valentina Voilkova as Svetlana, Viktor's sister
 Georgy Martirosyan as Stas Sedov
 Yelena Solovey as Maria Grigorievna Zenova
 Vladimir Soshalsky as Gubchenko
 Yevgeny Kindinov as Severtsev
 Lev Prygunov as Pavel Parin, ship's doctor
 Georgy Drozd as Yakov  Gursky, ship's doctor
 Zhanna Prokhorenko as hotel attendant
 Vladimir Valutsky as Pachinski
 Sergey Vinogradov as General Burylin

See also
 Golden Mine (1977)

References

External links

 Новейшая история отечественного кино: Р-Я

1984 television films
1984 films
Soviet  television films
Lenfilm films
Soviet crime films
Films based on Russian novels
1980s crime films
Soviet detective films